Arthur Hume (1838 – 2 February 1918) was an Irish-born British military officer and New Zealand civil servant. He served in the Cameron Highlanders in India. After serving briefly in Millbank, Dartmoor, Portland and Wormwood Scrubs prisons, he was appointed the first New Zealand Inspector-General of prisons starting in 1880 and was later simultaneously Commissioner of Police. From June 1888 Hume was inspector of volunteers in the New Zealand Militia.

References

British prison officials
Military personnel from Dublin (city)
Irish emigrants to New Zealand (before 1923)
New Zealand public servants
1830s births
1918 deaths
Year of birth uncertain
Place of birth missing